Rogue Arts is a film production company founded in 2003 and is based in Los Angeles, California. 

The company has produced 10 feature films and distributed over 60 titles from acclaimed international and American actors and directors such as Wim Wenders, Anders Thomas Jensen, Martin Sheen, John Malkovich, Benicio Del Toro, Mads Mikkelsen, Blythe Danner, Kirk Harris, Peter Falk, Ulrich Thomsen, Lyle Lovett, Rutger Hauer, Irina Bjorklund and Michael Rymer.  The sister company to Fairway Film Alliance, a world film sales and distribution company.

Notable film releases 
 Three Days of Rain (2004) - by Michael Meredith, presented by Wim Wenders
 Flickering Lights (2002) - by Anders Thomas Jensen
 Lola (2002) - by Carl Bessai
 Allie & Me (1998) - by Michael Rymer

Recent movies produced

 Army Dog (2015) - by Ezra Kemp
 The Sorrow (2012) - by Vernon Mortensen
 The Kid: Chamaco (2010) - by Miguel Necoechea

References 

hermosas-indie-film-company-rogue-arts-heads-for-higher-ground/

Indiewire

External links
 

Film distributors of the United States
Mass media companies established in 2004